The Danish Women's Volleyball Cup is a Women's Volleyball competition held in Denmark every single year since 1976, women clubs from all around the country division participate in a knock out face home and away system.

Competition history

Winners list

Honours by Club

References

External links
  Danish Volleyball Federation in (Danish)

Volleyball in Denmark